This article lists the winners and nominees for the Black Reel Award for Television for Outstanding Guest Actor, Drama Series. 
The category was first introduced as Outstanding Guest Performer, Drama Series, honoring both actors and actresses in guest starring roles on television. In 2018, the category was split into categories for each gender, resulting in the name change to its current title.

Winners and nominees
Winners are listed first and highlighted in bold.

2010s

2020s

Superlatives

Programs with multiple awards

2 awards
 This Is Us

Performers with multiple awards

Programs with multiple nominations

6 nominations
 This Is Us

3 nominations 
 Luke Cage
 Queen Sugar

2 nominations
 The Chi

Performers with multiple nominations

3 nominations
 Ron Cephas Jones

2 nominations
 Mahershala Ali
 Common
 Carl Lumbly

Total awards by network
 NBC - 2
 The CW - 1
 HBO - 1
 Netflix - 1

References

Black Reel Awards